Claosaurus (Greek κλάω, klao meaning 'broken' and , sauros meaning 'lizard'; "broken lizard", referring to the odd position of the fossils when discovered) is a genus of hadrosauroid dinosaur that lived during the Late Cretaceous Period (Santonian-Campanian).

Traditionally classified as an early member of the family Hadrosauridae, a 2008 analysis found Claosaurus agilis to be outside of the clade containing Hadrosaurus and other hadrosaurids, making it the closest non-hadrosaurid relative of true hadrosaurids within the clade Hadrosauria.

Description
Because of the insufficient fossil remains ("minority of skull and partial skeleton"), the size of an adult Claosaurus remains uncertain. Like other hadrosaurs, it was an herbivore.

History 
   
Evidence of its existence was first found in the Niobrara Formation near the Smoky Hill River in Kansas, United States in the form of partial skull fragments and as an articulated postcranial skeleton. Originally named Hadrosaurus agilis (Marsh, 1872), it was placed in a new genus and renamed Claosaurus agilis in 1890 when major differences between the specimen and Hadrosaurus came to light.

In 1892, Marsh named a second species, C. annectens. It was later reassigned to Anatosaurus and then Edmontosaurus, where it is currently. G. R. Wieland named third species C. affinis in 1903, which he compared to C. annectens. C. affinis was founded on remains from the Pierre Shale of South Dakota, found in association with remains of the giant sea turtle Archelon.  At some point after its description, the fragmentary remains were mixed up with the original remains of C. agilis, and a toe bone from C. agilis was accidentally thought to be the only part of the holotype remains that could be located. This was corrected by Joseph Gregory in 1948, who found three toe bones from the right foot of a large hadrosaur in the Yale collections that had comparable preservation to the Pierre Shale turtle remains and were associated with labels in Wieland's handwriting. Gregory found the toe bones to be very similar in size to the corresponding bones of Marsh's Claosaurus annectens, but did not reassign the species due to its much older age and fragmentary remains. C. affinis was considered a dubious hadrosaur in the 2004 review by Jack Horner and colleagues. They reported its type material as lost, although they also reported the remains as only including a single toe bone, instead of the three toe bones described by Gregory.

Reports of gastroliths, or stomach stones, in Claosaurus are actually based on a probable double misidentification. The specimen though to have gastroliths is actually of Edmontosaurus annectens. Barnum Brown, who discovered the specimen in 1900, referred to it as Claosaurus, because E. annectens was thought to be a species of Claosaurus at the time. Additionally, it is more likely that the supposed gastroliths represent gravel washed in during burial.

See also

 Timeline of hadrosaur research

Notes
 This species is not accepted as representing Claosaurus in reviews of the genus, but has not been given its own genus and is unlikely to receive one.

References

Late Cretaceous dinosaurs of North America
Hadrosaurs
Fossil taxa described in 1890
Taxa named by Othniel Charles Marsh
Paleontology in Kansas
Ornithischian genera